Leylak (also Romanized as Leylak and Līlak; also known as Līlag) is a village in Delvar Rural District, Delvar District, Tangestan County, Bushehr Province, Iran. At the 2006 census, its population was 543, in 113 families.

References 

Populated places in Tangestan County